The 2000 Finnish Cup was the 46th season of the main annual association football cup competition in Finland. It was organised as a single-elimination knock–out tournament and participation in the competition was voluntary.  The final was held at the Finnair Stadium, Helsinki on 10 November 2000 with HJK defeating Kotkan TP by 1-0 before an attendance of 3,471 spectators.

Early rounds 
Not currently available.

Round 7

Quarter-finals

Semi-finals

Final

References

External links
 Suomen Cup Official site 

Finnish Cup seasons
Finnish Cup, 2000
Finnish Cup, 2000